Artyom Vladislavovich Tretyakov (born 2 May 1994) is a Russian football player.

Club career
He made his debut in the Russian Football National League for FC Tyumen on 11 July 2016 in a game against FC Dynamo Moscow.

References

External links
 
 Profile by Russian Football National League

1994 births
Sportspeople from Omsk
Living people
Russian footballers
Association football forwards
FC Tyumen players
FC Irtysh Omsk players
Russian First League players
Russian Second League players